Rasmus Borowski (born May 21, 1974) is a German composer, singer, and actor.

Early life and education
Rasmus Borowski was born in Hamburg in 1974. His parents, recording engineer Richard Borowski and singer Gabi Borowski, often took him to the cinema, where Rasmus discovered his passion for films and music. At the age of four, Rasmus performed his first voice recording in a studio. When he was seven, he started taking guitar lessons.
Around this time, he also started making his first short films with his father's Super 8mm film camera.
In 1985 he and his mother moved to Brunswick and then, in 1988, to Zimbabwe, where Rasmus went to a boarding school. In 1990, Rasmus returned to Brunswick to finish school in Germany.

After his Abitur, Rasmus took guitar lessons with Andreas Becker (Fee, Peter Maffay), singing lessons with Jane Comerford (Texas Lightning), lessons in orchestral composing and arrangement with Matthias Petereit, as well as acting and voice over lessons with Prof. Marianne Bernhardt at the Hochschule für Musik und Theater Hamburg.

In 1998/2002, Rasmus successfully completed the Kontaktstudiengang Popularmusik (Popkurs) at the Hochschule für Musik und Theater Hamburg.
He attended master classes for composing with Academy Award winner Jan A.P. Kaczmarek and Japanese Academy Award winner Shigeru Umebayashi.
In 2006, Rasmus successfully completed the Filmmasters Program at Universal Studios in Los Angeles.

Rasmus Borowski lives and works in Hamburg and Berlin.

Band work, acting and directing

Bands
From 1996 to 1998, Rasmus Borowski was the songwriter and guitarist of the alternative rock band "Out".
From 1998 to 2006, he was the singer and songwriter of the rock band Lust as well as the pop project Borowski & Drusell.

Dubbing actor, audio drama actor and film actor
Rasmus Borowski has been working as a dubbing actor in Germany since 2000, dubbing stars such as Luke Evans, Martin Compston, Tom Burke or Jim Watson.

For the German version of the BBC-Series Line of Duty, he dubbed Martin Compston in his role as Steve Arnott.

Rasmus' voice can also be heard in audio dramas such as Die drei ???, TKKG and the German version of The Famous Five ("Fünf Freunde").

Since 2011, Rasmus is the voice of the Sith Warrior in the German version of the online roleplay game Star Wars: The Old Republic. Rasmus has played numerous roles as an actor in short films and on stage.

Films
In 2004 Rasmus Borowski produced, wrote and directed the acclaimed short film Der Beste (The Old Pro) together with illustrator and director Arne Jysch.

Der Beste received numerous awards, including the Shocking Shorts Award of the TV channel 13th Street in 2006, whereupon Rasmus was invited to Universal Studios in Los Angeles to attend the Filmmasters Program.

Film and television scoring
Inspired by the film score composers of his childhood days, Rasmus Borowski composed his first score for the short film Der Beste, recording with a string ensemble and several solo instruments. Several scores followed, including the soundtracks for the short films Meat the Campbells, The Dead Meat and Todd und der Tod.

Teacup Travels
In 2014 Rasmus Borowski composed the film score for the CBeebies series Teacup Travels together with Alexius Tschallener. They composed over 350 minutes of music for a total of 25 episodes of the drama series, which is produced by Plum Films in Edinburgh.
The classical orchestra music to be heard in Teacup Travels was recorded in October 2014 with the City of Prague Philharmonic Orchestra, conducted by Nic Raine at Smecky Music Studios in Prague.

Teacup Travels is Rasmus' second collaboration with producer Micky MacPherson and director Simon Hynd for whom he wrote the score to the short film Meat the Campbells in 2005.

Other orchestral work
In 2008 and 2009 Rasmus recorded his own compositions for orchestra with the Polish Radio Symphony Orchestra in Warsaw.

Awards and nominations
 2006: Shocking Shorts Award from NBCUniversal / 13th Street for Der Beste
 2006: Murnau short film award from the Friedrich-Wilhelm-Murnau foundation for Der Beste
 2006: Best European Short Film at the FIKE Film Festival, Évora for Der Beste
 2006: Audience Award at the Lund International Fantastic Film Festival for Der Beste
 2006: Golden Méliès Nomination at the Lund International Fantastic Film Festival for Der Beste
 2005: Best Independent Shortfilm at the Festival of Fantastic Films, Manchester for Der Beste
 2005: Winner Audience Award at the BIFFF Film Festival, Brussels for Der Beste
 2005: Prädikat: Besonders Wertvoll from the Deutsche Film- und Medienbewertung (FBW) for Der Beste

Filmography (selection)

Composer
 2016: Teacup Travels – Season 2 (TV-series)
 2016: 1000 Mexikaner (TV-movie)
 2014: Teacup Travels (TV-series)
 2007: The Dead Meat
 2005: Meat the Campbells (short film)
 2005: Todd und der Tod
 2004: Der Beste (short film)

Director
 2007: Google Earth – Fallen Heroes (commercial)
 2004: Der Beste (The Old Pro) (short film)

Actor
 2016: SMS für Dich (as Martin)
 2012: Steffi Likes That (as Agent Friendscout)
 2007: The Dead Meat (as Newsman)
 2005: Todd und der Tod (as Tod)
 2005: Der Upgrader (as Upgrader)

Voice actor

Dubbing actor for games (German)
 2015: Star Wars: The Old Republic – Knights of the Fallen Empire (as Sith Warrior)
 2014: Star Wars: The Old Republic – Shadow of Revan (as Sith Warrior)
 2014: Star Wars: The Old Republic – Rise of Hutt Cartel (as Sith Warrior)
 2010: Tale of a Hero (as Olaf)
 2009: The Godfather – Part II (as Michael Corleone)
 2008: Dragon Age (as Niall)
 2008: Need for Speed: Undercover (as Chau Wu)
 2005: Harry Potter – Quidditch-Worldcup (as Viktor Krum)
 2005: The Lord of the Rings: The Battle of Middle-earth 2 (as Easterling)
 2004: The Lord of the Rings: The Third Age (as Elf Warrior)
 2003: Need for Speed: Underground (as Todd)
 2003: Indiana Jones and the Emperor's Tomb

Dubbing actor (German)
 2015: Bob's Burgers (as Dr. Yap)
 2015: Between (as Pat for Jim Watson)
 2014: Line of Duty (as Steve Arnott for Martin Compston)
 2013: One Small Hitch (as Josh Shiffman for Shane McRae)
 2013: Ida (as Lis for Dawid Ogrodnik)
 2013: The Great Train Robbery (as Bruce Reynolds for Luke Evans)
 2012: An Enemy to Die For (as Terrence for Tom Burke)
 2012: Real Humans (as Rick for Johannes Kuhnke)
 2012: Catfish: The TV Show (as Nev for Nev Schulman)
 2009: Soul Eater (as Soul Eater)
 2009: Fanboy & Chum Chum (as Kyle)
 2007: Naruto (as Sakon & Ukon)
 2005: Transformers – TV Series (as Scattershot)

External links

Official Homepage of Rasmus Borowski 
Rasmus Borowski at IMDb 
Rasmus Borowski wins Shocking Shorts Award (TV Today – Germany) 
Teacup Travels (TV Series) at IMDb 
Rasmus Borowski and Teacup Travels at Accorder Music Publishing 
Composer for Teacup Travels: Photo of Rasmus Borowski :File:Film Composers Rasmus Borowski & Alexius Tschallener.jpg
The Old Pro – mystery short film by Rasmus Borowski 
The Old Pro – mystery short film at Wikipedia Der Beste (The Old Pro)

References

German film score composers
Male film score composers
German male composers
1974 births
21st-century classical composers
Living people
Musicians from Hamburg
German male voice actors
German male film actors
21st-century German male singers
21st-century German composers